"For Owen" is a poem by Stephen King first published in King's 1985 collection Skeleton Crew. The thirty-four line free verse poem consists of eleven unrhymed, unmetered verse paragraphs. The poem concerns King walking his son Owen to school, as the boy describes a fantastical school attended by anthropomorphized fruit.

See also
 Stephen King short fiction bibliography

1985 poems
American poems
Poetry by Stephen King